Dhamangaon Railway Assembly constituency is one of the 288 Vidhan Sabha (legislative assembly) constituencies in Maharashtra state in western India. This constituency is part of the eight constituencies located in the Amravati district.

Dhamangaon Railway is part of the Wardha Lok Sabha constituency along with five other Vidhan Sabha segments, namely Wardha, Arvi, Deoli and Hinganghat in Wardha district and Morshi in Amravati district. The Dhamangaon Railway constituency was earlier known as the Chandur Railway Constituency before the Delimitation of Constituencies in 2009.

As per orders of Delimitation of Parliamentary and Assembly constituencies Order, 2008, No. 36 Dhamangaon Railway Assembly constituency is composed of the following: 
1. Nandgaon-Khandeshwar Tehsil, 2. Chandur Railway Tehsil and 3. Dhamangaon Railway Tehsil of the district.

Members of Legislative Assembly

Election Result of Legislative Assembly

Source:

See also
 Dattapur Dhamangaon
 List of constituencies of Maharashtra Vidhan Sabha

References

Assembly constituencies of Maharashtra